Bernd Roos (born 1 September 1967) is a German former handball player. He competed at the 1992 Summer Olympics and the 2000 Summer Olympics.

References

External links
 

1967 births
Living people
German male handball players
Olympic handball players of Germany
Handball players at the 1992 Summer Olympics
Handball players at the 2000 Summer Olympics
People from Miltenberg
Sportspeople from Lower Franconia